Lunak (also Romanized as Lūnak) is a village in Tutaki Rural District, in the Central District of Siahkal County, Gilan Province, Iran. At the 2006 census, its population was twenty, consisting of five families.

References 

Populated places in Siahkal County